Matthew C. Carberry (July 31, 1911 – May 1986) was the Sheriff of the City and County of San Francisco from 1956 to 1972.  He was appointed by Mayor George Christopher after the death of Sheriff Daniel Gallagher.  A moderate conservative, he was defeated in his bid for a fifth term by the more liberal Richard Hongisto in the fall of 1971.  Prior to being appointed Sheriff, he served on the San Francisco Board of Supervisors and was president of the fire commission.

References

External links 
 Biography on the Sheriff's Department website

California sheriffs
1911 births
1986 deaths
San Francisco Board of Supervisors members
20th-century American politicians